The Wiseman's Tournament was a golf tournament held irregularly in Auckland, New Zealand from 1952 to 1964.

Winners

References

Golf tournaments in New Zealand
Recurring sporting events established in 1952
Recurring sporting events disestablished in 1964
1952 establishments in New Zealand
1964 disestablishments in New Zealand